Robin McAuley (born 20 January 1953) is an Irish singer. He is best known as the vocalist for the rock band McAuley Schenker Group from 1986 to 1993, which saw the band release three studio albums: Perfect Timing, Save Yourself, M.S.G., the live album Unplugged Live, and the Japan-only EP Nightmare: The Acoustic M.S.G. He has made further appearances with Schenker in 2012, and also in 2016 with Michael Schenker Fest alongside original MSG singers Gary Barden and Graham Bonnet, and Doogie White of Michael Schenker's Temple of Rock.

in 1991, he did a song called "Teach Me How to Dream" from the 1991 spy action comedy film If Looks Could Kill on the film's soundtrack as the love theme. 

McAuley has also performed with Grand Prix, Survivor and Far Corporation; including singing on their UK #8 single, a version of Led Zeppelin's "Stairway to Heaven". In 1999, McAuley released his solo album, Business As Usual, written and recorded with the help of future Survivor bandmate, Frankie Sullivan.

McAuley is also a longtime member of the star-studded Raiding the Rock Vault cast and the vocalist for all-star project Black Swan featuring Reb Beach and fellow Rock Vault alumni, Jeff Pilson and Matt Starr, whose debut album, Shake the World, was released in February 2020. In a 2021 interview with Pariah Burke, McAuley stated the album is his personal favorite he's ever done.  

McAuley has also been known to play alongside his son, Casey.

Discography

Solo albums
 Business as Usual (1999)
 Standing on the Edge (2021)
 Alive (2023)

with Grand Prix
 There for None to See (1982)
 Samurai (1983)

with Far Corporation
 Division One (1985)
 Solitude (1994)

with McAuley Schenker Group
 Perfect Timing (1987)
 Save Yourself (1989)
 M.S.G. (1992)

with GMT
 War Games (1985)

with Michael Schenker Fest
 Resurrection (2018)
 Revelation (2019)

with Black Swan
 Shake the World (2020)
 Generation Mind (2022)

References

[ Robin McAuley] on AllMusic
Melodic Rock: Interview with Robin McAuley

External links
Official website
MusicMight biography
 

1953 births
Living people
Irish heavy metal singers
Irish male singers
Irish rock singers
McAuley Schenker Group members
Michael Schenker Group members
People from County Meath
Survivor (band) members
Musicians from Dublin (city)